Laman Alimuradova (born 29 November 2004) is an Azerbaijani group rhythmic gymnast. She is the 2022 World 3 ribbons + 2 balls bronze medalist. She is the 2020 European group all-around silver medalist and 2022 European group all-around bronze medalist.

Career
Alimuradova began rhythmic gymnastics when she was eight years old.

Junior
In 2019, she became a part of Azerbaijani junior group and was the group's captain. They competed at the 2019 European Championships in Baku, Azerbaijan, where they placed fifth in group all-around and sixth in 5 Hoops final. She also competed at the 2019 Junior World Championships in Moscow, Russia and placed eighth in group all-around and seventh in 5 Hoops final.

Senior
Alimuradova became age-eligible for senior competition in 2020. She competed at the 2020 European Championships in Kyiv. Together with Zeynab Hummatova, Darya Sorokina, Yelyzaveta Luzan and Maryam Safarova, she won a silver medal in group all-around and a bronze medal in 3 Hoops + 4 Clubs final. They also won the bronze medal in the team competition together with the juniors.

At the 2021 Sofia World Cup, Alimuradova and the Azerbaijani group won the all-around silver medal and the bronze medal in the 3 Hoops + 4 Clubs final. Then at the Baku World Cup, the group won the bronze medal in the 5 Balls final and placed fourth in the all-around and fifth in the 3 Hoops + 4 Clubs final. Then at the 2021 European Championships, the Azerbaijani group placed seventh in the all-around and team event, sixth in the 5 Balls final, and fourth in the 3 Hoops + 4 Clubs final.

Alimuradova was selected to represent Azerbaijan at the 2020 Summer Olympics alongside Darya Sorokina, Zeynab Hummatova, Yelyzaveta Luzan, and Narmina Samadova. They finished tenth in the qualification round for the group all-around and were the second reserve for the final. She was then selected to compete at the 2021 World Championships. The Azerbaijani group finished sixth in the group all-around and qualified for both event finals. The group finished sixth in both the 5 balls and the 3 hoops + 4 clubs finals.

Alimuradova and the Azerbaijani group won the 5 hoops gold medal and the all-around silver medal at the 2022 Baku World Cup. At the 2022 Pamplona World Challenge Cup, she won three bronze medals in the group all-around, 5 hoops, and 3 ribbons + 2 balls. Then at the European Championships in Tel Aviv, the Azerbaijani group won the bronze medals in the group all-around, 5 hoops, and 3 ribbons + 2 balls. She then represented Azerbaijan at the 2021 Islamic Solidarity Games where the Azerbaijani group won the gold medal in the all-around. Then in the event finals, they won gold in 3 ribbons + 2 balls and silver in 5 hoops behind Uzbekistan.

Alimuradova competed at the 2022 World Championships alongside Gullu Aghalarzade, Zeynab Hummatova, Yelyzaveta Luzan, and Darya Sorokina. In the 3 ribbons + 2 balls final, the group won the bronze medal behind Bulgaria and Italy. This marked the first time an Azerbaijani group won a medal at the Rhythmic Gymnastics World Championships.

References

External links 
 

Living people
2004 births
Azerbaijani rhythmic gymnasts
Sportspeople from Baku
Medalists at the Rhythmic Gymnastics European Championships
Gymnasts at the 2020 Summer Olympics
Olympic gymnasts of Azerbaijan
Medalists at the Rhythmic Gymnastics World Championships
21st-century Azerbaijani women